

List of rulers of the Gibe kingdom of Limmu-Ennarea
The Gibe kingdom is located in present-day Ethiopia.

Source: Information about pre-Oromo kings from Werner J. Lange, History of the Southern Gonga (Southwestern Ethiopia), (Wiesbaden: Franz Steiner, 1982), pp. 28–30.

See also
Monarchies of Ethiopia
List of emperors of Ethiopia
Lists of rulers of Ethiopia

Gibe Limu
Gibe Limu
 Limu